Peter Bennie (10 June 1899 – 1981) was a Scottish professional footballer who played as an outside right.

Born in Slamannan but raised in Larkhall, he began his Scottish Football League career in 1920 with Albion Rovers where he gradually displaced Bill Ribchester in the side, before moving to England to join Burnley in 1923. A year later he moved to Bradford City, featuring for three seasons before retiring due to injury.

He was a member of a footballing family: his father Peter and uncle John had short careers in Scotland, another uncle Bob played for Newcastle United, and his cousin Bob was a Scottish international.

References

1899 births
1981 deaths
Date of death unknown
Scottish footballers
Footballers from Falkirk (council area)
Footballers from South Lanarkshire
Sportspeople from Larkhall
Association football outside forwards
Larkhall Thistle F.C. players
Bellshill Athletic F.C. players
Royal Albert F.C. players
Albion Rovers F.C. players
Burnley F.C. players
Bradford City A.F.C. players
English Football League players
Scottish Football League players